The 1989–90 NBA season was the 20th season for the Portland Trail Blazers in the National Basketball Association. During the off-season, the Blazers acquired All-Star forward Buck Williams from the New Jersey Nets. The Blazers held a 33–13 record at the All-Star break, then posted a ten-game winning streak in March, and finished second in the Pacific Division with a franchise-high 59–23 record, and returned to the NBA Finals for the first time since their championship season of 1976–77.

Clyde Drexler averaged 23.3 points, 6.9 rebounds, 5.9 assists and 2.0 steals per game, and was named to the All-NBA Third Team, and selected for the 1990 NBA All-Star Game. In addition, Terry Porter averaged 17.6 points, 9.1 assists and 1.9 steals per game, while Kevin Duckworth provided the team with 16.2 points and 6.2 rebounds, and Jerome Kersey contributed 16.0 points, 8.4 rebounds and 1.5 steals per game. Williams provided with 13.6 points and 9.8 rebounds per game, and was named to the NBA All-Defensive First Team, and second round draft pick Clifford Robinson contributed 9.1 points per game off the bench.

In the Western Conference First Round of the playoffs, the acquisition of Williams continued to help make the Blazers stronger as they won their first playoff series in five years, by sweeping the Dallas Mavericks in three straight games. In the Western Conference Semi-finals, the Blazers needed seven games to get past the San Antonio Spurs as the home team won all seven games. In the Western Conference Finals, the Trail Blazers continued to defend their home court well, jumping out to a 2–0 lead over the Phoenix Suns. The Suns rebounded to take the next two in Phoenix as the Blazers won Game 5 at home, 120–114. However, there would be no need for a seventh game, as the Blazers knocked off the Suns with a 112–109 win in Game 6 to reach the NBA Finals for the second time in franchise history.

In the Finals, the Trail Blazers faced off against the defending NBA Champion Detroit Pistons. After losing Game 1 in Detroit, 105–99, the Blazers would even the series at one game a piece, winning Game 2 in overtime, 106–105. However, the Blazers dropped all three games at home as the Pistons won the NBA title in five games, winning their second consecutive championship.

Draft picks

Roster

Regular season

Season standings

z – clinched division title
y – clinched division title
x – clinched playoff spot

Record vs. opponents

Game log

Playoffs

|- align="center" bgcolor="#ccffcc"
| 1
| April 26
| Dallas
| W 109–102
| Terry Porter (28)
| Buck Williams (16)
| Porter, Drexler (5)
| Memorial Coliseum12,884
| 1–0
|- align="center" bgcolor="#ccffcc"
| 2
| April 28
| Dallas
| W 114–107
| Kevin Duckworth (18)
| Buck Williams (13)
| Clyde Drexler (7)
| Memorial Coliseum12,884
| 2–0
|- align="center" bgcolor="#ccffcc"
| 3
| May 1
| @ Dallas
| W 106–92
| Jerome Kersey (29)
| Buck Williams (10)
| Clyde Drexler (10)
| Reunion Arena17,007
| 3–0
|-

|- align="center" bgcolor="#ccffcc"
| 1
| May 5
| San Antonio
| W 107–94
| Jerome Kersey (25)
| Jerome Kersey (16)
| Clyde Drexler (11)
| Memorial Coliseum12,884
| 1–0
|- align="center" bgcolor="#ccffcc"
| 2
| May 8
| San Antonio
| W 122–112
| Terry Porter (27)
| Buck Williams (8)
| Clyde Drexler (8)
| Memorial Coliseum12,884
| 2–0
|- align="center" bgcolor="#ffcccc"
| 3
| May 10
| @ San Antonio
| L 98–121
| Porter, Williams (18)
| Clifford Robinson (8)
| Clyde Drexler (9)
| HemisFair Arena15,910
| 2–1
|- align="center" bgcolor="#ffcccc"
| 4
| May 12
| @ San Antonio
| L 105–115
| Clyde Drexler (27)
| Buck Williams (10)
| Clyde Drexler (7)
| HemisFair Arena15,910
| 2–2
|- align="center" bgcolor="#ccffcc"
| 5
| May 15
| San Antonio
| W 138–132 (2OT)
| Terry Porter (38)
| Kersey, Williams (10)
| Clyde Drexler (9)
| Memorial Coliseum12,884
| 3–2
|- align="center" bgcolor="#ffcccc"
| 6
| May 17
| @ San Antonio
| L 97–112
| Jerome Kersey (22)
| Buck Williams (10)
| Clyde Drexler (7)
| HemisFair Arena15,910
| 3–3
|- align="center" bgcolor="#ccffcc"
| 7
| May 19
| San Antonio
| W 108–105 (OT)
| Terry Porter (36)
| Williams, Kersey (15)
| Terry Porter (9)
| Memorial Coliseum12,884
| 4–3
|-

|- align="center" bgcolor="#ccffcc"
| 1
| May 21
| Phoenix
| W 100–98
| Clyde Drexler (20)
| Jerome Kersey (11)
| Terry Porter (9)
| Memorial Coliseum12,884
| 1–0
|- align="center" bgcolor="#ccffcc"
| 2
| May 23
| Phoenix
| W 108–107
| Jerome Kersey (29)
| Jerome Kersey (11)
| Clyde Drexler (6)
| Memorial Coliseum12,884
| 2–0
|- align="center" bgcolor="#ffcccc"
| 3
| May 25
| @ Phoenix
| L 89–123
| Jerome Kersey (16)
| Mark Bryant (7)
| Clyde Drexler (6)
| Arizona Veterans Memorial Coliseum14,487
| 2–1
|- align="center" bgcolor="#ffcccc"
| 4
| May 27
| @ Phoenix
| L 107–119
| Jerome Kersey (29)
| Buck Williams (8)
| Terry Porter (12)
| Arizona Veterans Memorial Coliseum14,487
| 2–2
|- align="center" bgcolor="#ccffcc"
| 5
| May 29
| Phoenix
| W 120–114
| Clyde Drexler (32)
| Jerome Kersey (11)
| Terry Porter (12)
| Memorial Coliseum12,884
| 3–2
|- align="center" bgcolor="#ccffcc"
| 6
| May 31
| @ Phoenix
| W 112–109
| Drexler, Porter (23)
| Buck Williams (11)
| Drexler, Porter (7)
| Arizona Veterans Memorial Coliseum14,487
| 4–2
|-

|- align="center" bgcolor="#ffcccc"
| 1
| June 5
| @ Detroit
| L 99–105
| Clyde Drexler (21)
| Buck Williams (12)
| Terry Porter (8)
| The Palace at Auburn Hills21,454
| 0–1
|- align="center" bgcolor="#ccffcc"
| 2
| June 7
| @ Detroit
| W 106–105 (OT)
| Clyde Drexler (33)
| Buck Williams (12)
| Terry Porter (10)
| The Palace at Auburn Hills21,454
| 1–1
|- align="center" bgcolor="#ffcccc"
| 3
| June 10
| Detroit
| L 106–121
| Jerome Kersey (27)
| Clyde Drexler (13)
| Terry Porter (9)
| Memorial Coliseum12,884
| 1–2
|- align="center" bgcolor="#ffcccc"
| 4
| June 12
| Detroit
| L 109–112
| Clyde Drexler (34)
| Drexler, Kersey (8)
| Clyde Drexler (10)
| Memorial Coliseum12,642
| 1–3
|- align="center" bgcolor="#ffcccc"
| 5
| June 14
| Detroit
| L 90–92
| Duckworth, Porter (21)
| Jerome Kersey (9)
| Terry Porter (9)
| Memorial Coliseum12,642
| 1–4
|-

Player statistics

NOTE: Please write the players statistics in alphabetical order by last name.

Season

Playoffs

Awards and records
During the season, Dražen Petrović won the Euroscar, presented by the Italian basketball magazine Superbasket to the top player in Europe. Unlike major NBA awards, the Euroscar is awarded for a player's performance during a calendar year, and also takes into account a player's performances for his national team. In Petrović's case, the award considered his performances in 1989 for Real Madrid and the Yugoslavia national team, as well as the Blazers. This was the second of what would eventually be four Euroscars for Petrović.

Milestones

Transactions

References

External links
 Blazers on Database Basketball

Portland Trail Blazers seasons
Western Conference (NBA) championship seasons
Portland Trail Blazers 1989
Portland Trail Blazers 1989
Port
Port
Portland